= Agencynet =

American digital marketing agency

AgencyNet
- Type: Privately owned
- Industry: Digital marketing
- Founded: 1994
- Founder: Richard Lent
- Headquarters: Fort Lauderdale, FL; New York, NY
- Area served: Global
- Number of employees: 60
- Website: http://www.agencynet.com

AgencyNet is a digital marketing agency for a variety of industries based in New York City and Fort Lauderdale, Florida. In November 2012, AgencyNet rebranded as AgencyTen.

== Background ==
AgencyNet was founded in 1994 by Richard Lent in New York City. In 2000, the company moved to Fort Lauderdale, Florida. In 2008, the company expanded by opening another office New York City. The company has recently produced work for Jay-Z and Rihanna.

== Recognition ==
Named "one of the hottest digital agencies around" by Advertising Age, AgencyNet's work has been recipient of over 130 awards including an Interactive Emmy, FWA, Cannes Lion, SXSW's Best in Show, as well as The Webby.
